Victory: World War II is a 1998 board game published by Columbia Games.

Gameplay
Victory: World War II is a game in which blocks representing World War II units are played on a set of four modular maps.

Reception
The online second version of Pyramid  reviewed Victory: World War II and commented that "This elegant system provides not only a handsome game, but also a painless way to handle fog of war, hit reduction, and combat results in one easy mechanic."

Reviews
Backstab #19

References

Board games introduced in 1998
Columbia Games games